Wroniec may refer to:
 Wroniec, Lesser Poland Voivodeship, a village
 Wroniec (book), a novel by Jacek Dukaj